Pseudocoarica is a monotypic moth genus of the family Erebidae. Its only species, Pseudocoarica caledonica, is found in New Caledonia. Both the genus and species were first described by Jeremy Daniel Holloway in 1979.

References

Calpinae
Monotypic moth genera